Orodus (from  , 'beautiful' and   'tooth') is an extinct genus of cartilaginous fish that lived from the late Pennsylvanian to the early Permian in what is now North America. Growing up to 2 m (7 ft) in length, it was quite large for sharks of its time.

References

Sources
 Wildlife of Gondwana: Dinosaurs and Other Vertebrates from the Ancient Supercontinent (Life of the Past) by Pat Vickers Rich, Thomas Hewitt Rich, Francesco Coffa, and Steven Morton
 Biology of Sharks and Their Relatives (Marine Biology) by Jeffrey C. Carrier, John A. Musick, and Michael R. Heithaus
 Kansas Geology: An Introduction to Landscapes, Rocks, Minerals, and Fossils by Rex Buchanan  
 Major Events in Early Vertebrate Evolution (Systematics Association Special Volume) by Per Erik Ahlberg

External links
Orodus in the Paleobiology Database

Prehistoric cartilaginous fish genera
Carboniferous cartilaginous fish
Permian cartilaginous fish
Pennsylvanian fish of North America
Permian fish of North America
Taxa named by Louis Agassiz